Christ Church, also known as Christ Church New Haven, is an Episcopal parish church at 70 Broadway in New Haven, Connecticut. Christ Church follows an Anglo-Catholic style of worship and has a strong focus on urban ministry.  The parish began as an offshoot from New Haven's Trinity Church, the central Episcopal church on New Haven's town green.

The church building was listed on the National Register of Historic Places in 2009.

History
The church building, completed in 1898, was designed by architect Henry Vaughan.

It is notable for its very fine Gothic architecture, and its central location near downtown New Haven makes it something of a landmark. Its stone tower is modeled on the tower of Magdalen College, Oxford.  Vaughn personally chose the artists who created the beautiful interior. Bavarian-born Johannes Kirchmayer executed the intricate wood carving, notable in particular on the rood screen. The stained glass windows (including a large window at the back of the sanctuary above the baptismal font) were created by the noted firm of C.E. Kempe in London. The high altar also features monmunental stone figures and a carved Caen stone reredos inspired by examples in Winchester Cathedral and St. Alban's in England.

The church's Solemn High Mass (11:00am Sundays) is locally notable for its fine choral music and beautiful liturgy.  Compline, sung at 9:00pm September–May, draws a large crowd of both young and old from the city of New Haven and surrounding communities as well as from nearby Yale University. Christ Church also houses the headquarters of the North American branch of the Society of Catholic Priests, a society of clergy in the mainstream of the Episcopal Church who practice the Anglo-Catholic tradition.

See also
National Register of Historic Places listings in New Haven, Connecticut

References

External links
The Website of Christ Church, New Haven
Historical resources on Christ Church, New Haven from Project Canterbury

19th-century Episcopal church buildings
20th-century Episcopal church buildings
Anglo-Catholic church buildings in the United States
Churches completed in 1898
Churches in New Haven, Connecticut
Churches on the National Register of Historic Places in Connecticut
Episcopal church buildings in Connecticut
Gothic Revival church buildings in Connecticut
National Register of Historic Places in New Haven, Connecticut
Religious organizations established in 1854
1854 establishments in Connecticut